Lyudmyla Pushkina (born October 2, 1965) is a female long-distance runner from Ukraine. She set her personal best (2:28:15) in the women's marathon on October 19, 2003 in Columbus, Ohio.

Achievements

References

marathoninfo

1965 births
Living people
Ukrainian female long-distance runners
Ukrainian female marathon runners